Dave or David Preston may refer to:

Dave Preston (American football) (born 1955), American football player
Dave Preston (motorcycling) (born 1947), author
Dave Preston (producer), record producer with Phil K
 David L. Preston, American historian